The phrase "Goffe and Whalley" or "Whalley and Goffe" refers to two men who fled in 1660 to Massachusetts Bay Colony and ultimately New Haven after their involvement in the 1649 regicide of King Charles I of England:

 William Goffe, an English Roundhead politician and soldier
 Edward Whalley, an English military leader during the English Civil War

The phrase is occasionally used as metonym or synecdoche for the tribunal of men (also called regicides) who ordered the king's execution.

Another regicide of Charles I who fled separately to New Haven Colony, John Dixwell, is sometimes included in the phrase (as in "Goffe, Whalley, and Dixwell").

See also 
 Charles I of England
 Regicide of Charles I of England
 List of regicides of Charles I
 High Court of Justice for the trial of Charles I
 English Civil War
 English Restoration

Charles I of England
Regicides of Charles I
English phrases